Pađene is a village in the Šibenik-Knin County, Croatia. The settlement is administered as a part of Ervenik municipality.

Location
It is located in Zagora, 12 kilometers from Knin, on the state road D1.

Population
According to national census of 2011, population of the settlement is 175. The majority of the population are Serbs. In 1991, 99% of the population was Serb.

Gallery

References

External links
 Pađene 

Populated places in Šibenik-Knin County